Two for Joy is a 2018 British psychological drama film written and directed by Tom Beard and starring Samantha Morton, Billie Piper, Emilia Jones, Bella Ramsey, Badger Skelton, and Daniel Mays.  It is Beard's feature directorial debut.

The film premiered on September 27, 2018, in the United Kingdom, and was later widely released two years later on April 27, 2021.

Premise
When Aisha descends into depression after her husband's death, her oldest daughter Vi finds herself forced to bear the major responsibilities of a parent, while her younger son Troy is excluded from school and increasingly cut off from the rest of the family. From there, an unexpected tragedy will either make or break an already fractured family.

Cast
Samantha Morton as Aisha
Emilia Jones as Vi
Billie Piper as Lillah
Bella Ramsey as Miranda
Badger Skelton as Troy
Daniel Mays as Lias

Reception
The film has  rating on Rotten Tomatoes out of 16 reviews.  Beth Webb of Empire awarded the film four stars out of five.

Stephen Farber of The Hollywood Reporter gave the film a positive review and wrote "Beard expects us to learn about the characters through their physical interactions as well as their facial expressions, and we end up caring deeply about these people even without conventional movie storytelling."

References

External links
 
 

British drama films
2018 drama films
2010s English-language films
2010s British films